Larvaceans, class Appendicularia, are solitary, free-swimming tunicates found throughout the world's oceans. Like most tunicates, larvaceans are filter feeders. Unlike most other tunicates, they live in the pelagic zone, specifically in the photic zone, or sometimes deeper.

Anatomy
The adult larvaceans resemble the tadpole-like larvae of most tunicates. Like a common tunicate larva, the adult Appendicularia have a discrete trunk and tail.

Larvaceans produce a "house" made of mucopolysaccharides and cellulose. In most species, the house surrounds the animal like a bubble. Even for species in which the house does not completely surround the body, such as Fritillaria, the house is always present and attached to at least one surface.

These houses are discarded and replaced regularly as the animal grows in size and its filters become clogged; in Oikopleura, a house is kept for no more than four hours before being replaced. No other tunicate is able to abandon its test in this fashion. Discarded larvacean houses account for a significant fraction of organic material descending to the ocean depths.

The tail of larvaceans contain a central notochord, a dorsal nerve cord, and a series of striated muscle bands enveloped either by epithelial tissue (oikopleurids) or by an acellular basement membrane (fritillarids). Unlike the Ascidiacea larvae, the tail nerve cord in larvaceans contain some neurons.

As the larvae of ascidian tunicates don't feed at all, the larvae of doliolids goes through their metamorphosis while still inside the egg, and salps and pyrosomes have both lost the larval stage, it makes the larvaceans the only tunicates that feed and has fully functional internal organs during their tailed "tadpole stage", which in Larvacea is permanent.

Feeding
Larvaceans have greatly improved the efficiency of food intake by producing a test, which contains a complicated arrangement of filters that allow food in the surrounding water to be brought in and concentrated prior to feeding. By regularly beating the tail, the larvacean can generate water currents within its house that allow the concentration of food. The high efficiency of this method allows larvaceans to feed on much smaller nanoplankton than most other filter feeders.

Like most tunicates, larvaceans feed by drawing particulate food matter into their pharyngobranchial region, where food particles are trapped on a mucus mesh produced by the pharynx and drawn into the digestive tract. The mucus mesh lies over two clefts in the pharynx, one on either side, rather than the much larger number of clefts found in most other tunicates. 

Furthermore, the Appendicularia retain the ancestral Chordate characteristics of having the clefts, and the anus open directly to the outside, and by the lack of the atrium and the atrial siphon found in related classes.

Reproduction and genetics
Larvaceans reproduce sexually. The immature animals resemble the tadpole larvae of ascidians, albeit with the addition of developing viscera. Once the trunk is fully developed, the larva undergoes "tail shift", in which the tail moves from a rearward position to a ventral orientation and twists 90° relative to the trunk. Following tail shift, the larvacean begins secretion of the first house.

Fertilisation is external. During egg release the body wall ruptures, killing the animal.

The recent development of techniques for expressing foreign genes in Oikopleura dioica, which unlike all other known larvaceans have separate sexes instead of being a protandric hermaphrodite, has led to the advancement of this species as a model organism for the study of gene regulation, chordate evolution, and development.

References

 
 

 

de:Copelata